Ann Beam is a multimedia artist based in M'Chigeeng First Nation, Manitoulin Island. Born Ann Elena Weatherby in 1944 in Brooklyn, New York, she is the spouse of artist Carl Beam. She has a BFA from State University of New York at Buffalo. She taught at the Art Gallery of Ontario in the late 1960s and 1970s and later managed the Neon Raven Art Gallery on Manitoulin Island. Themes covered in her art have been described as "cultural histories of women's labour in building homes, in motherhood, cooking and teaching." She has worked with various mediums, including oil and acrylic, found art, recycled materials, pottery, paper and cloth.

Public collections
Tom Thomson Art Gallery, Owen Sound, Ontario
Royal Ontario Museum, Toronto, Ontario
Justina M Barnicke Gallery, Hart House, University of Toronto
Gardiner Museum of Ceramic Art, Toronto, Ontario
Art Gallery of Peterborough, Peterborough, Ontario
Canadian Clay and Glass Gallery, Waterloo, Ontario
Canada Council Art Bank, Ottawa, Ontario
Carleton University Art Gallery, Ottawa, Ontario
MacLaren Art Centre, Barrie, Ontario
Simon Fraser University, British Columbia
Art Gallery of Algoma, Sault Ste. Marie, Ontario
College Boreal, Sudbury Ontario
University of Toronto, Thomas Fisher Rare Book Library
Art Gallery of Nova Scotia

Exhibitions

2014 Continuously Arriving Moment, Gallery Stratford, Stratford Ontario. July 5-October
2014 Express Wagon, La Galerie Nouvel Ontario, Sudbury, Ontario. Jan. 24-March 1, 2014. Solo Exhibition
2013 The Engine Room, Tom Thomson Art Gallery, Owen Sound, Ontario. Solo Exhibition
2012 New Vision=New World, Neon Raven Art Gallery, Solo Show M'chigeeng, Ontario. July 1- August 30, 2012
2011 Waterfall, Solo Exhibition, Neon Raven Art Gallery, M'chigeeng, Ontario. July 9 - Sept. 15, 2011
2010 Cross Pollination 2, Gore Bay Museum, Gore Bay, Ontario. Group Show, October 14, 2010
2009 No Drips Allowed, Jonathon Bancroft Snell Gallery, London, Ontario. January - March 2009
2008 Earth and Shell, Solo Exhibition, Gore Bay Museum, Gore Bay, Ontario. Aug.16-Oct.14,2008
2008 Beyond Space and Time, Durham Art Gallery, Durham, Ontario. Two Person Show
2007 On The Table; 100 Years of Functional Ceramics in Canada, Gardiner Museum, Toronto, Ontario. Jan.15 - April 30, 2007, Winnipeg Art Gallery, and Art Gallery of Nova Scotia. Group Show
2006 Picturing Her: Images of Girlhood, McCord Museum, Montreal, Quebec, Dec.1,2005-April 6, 2006, Group Show
2005 Corona-Dialogues with Earth Mother, Solo Show Sheguiandah, Centennial Museum, Sheguiandah, Ontario
2004 It's All Relative, Touring Exhibition, Three Person Show with Carl Beam and Anong Beam. Canadian Clay Glass Museum, Waterloo, Ontario.; Algoma Art Gallery, Sault Ste. Marie, Ontario.; Thunder Bay Art Gallery, Thunder Bay, Ontario.; April 15-May 22, 2005, Art Gallery of Peterborough, Ontario
2003 Motherlines, Solo Exhibition, Carleton University Art Gallery, Ottawa, Ontario. January 13 - February 23, 2003
2003 All Things Are Connected, Residency at the Gardiner Museum of Ceramic Art, Toronto, Ontario
2002 Shamans and Ravens, Ann Beam, Two Person Show, DeLeon White Gallery, Toronto, Ontario. Mar 31 - July 13
2001 Steel City Gallery, Hamilton, Ontario. with Novak Graphics. Dec 1,- June 15, 2002, Group Show
2000 Novak Graphics Print Show, Liu Haisu Museum, Shanghai, China, October, Group Show
2001 Novak Graphics, Xien- Shen, China, January 2001
2000 Studies in the Motherline, Solo Exhibition, V. Mcdonnell Gallery, Toronto, Ontario. January 8- February 15
2000 Subdivision Suite/Earth Builder's Narrative, Solo Exhibition, Struts Gallery, Sackville, NB October 12- Nov. 4, 2000
1996 Nellie and Mary and Related Works, Solo Exhibition, La Parete Gallery, Toronto, Ontario. Sept.22 - Oct.8
1992 East of the Diamond Lightning, Solo Exhibition, Art Gallery of Peterborough, Peterborough, Ontario
1992 Works by Ann and Carl Beam, Ufundi Gallery, Ottawa, Ontario
1992 A Response, Group Show, Art Space, Peterborough, Ontario
1986 Constellation of Solitaire, Solo Exhibition, Brignall Gallery, 80 Spadina Ave. Toronto, Ontario
1983 Indians and Angels, Ann Beam, Laurentian University Museum and Art Centre, Sudbury, Ontario
1982 The Painted Pottery of Ann and Carl Beam, Maxwell Museum, The University of New Mexico, Albuquerque
1977 Prints From Open Studio, Group Show, McDonald Block, Queen's Park, Toronto, Ontario
1977 O.S. Prints, Group Show, Glenbow Museum, Calgary Alberta
1976 The Chair Show, Group Show, Art Gallery of Ontario, Toronto, Ontario

References

External links
Ann Beam Galerie du Nouvel-Ontario (GNO)
Ann Beam and Carl Beam : SFU Gallery, Burnaby, January 15 to June 20, 2019

Women multimedia artists
20th-century ceramists
Living people
1944 births